The 33rd European Inline Speed Skating Championships were held in L'Aquila, Italy, from 4–11 September 2022. Organized by European Confederation of Roller Skating and Federazione Italiana Sport Rotellistici.

L'Aquila hosted the Europeans Inline Speed for the first time, taking place in three different venues;
Pista Vesmaco di Santa Barbara for track events. Pista Vesmaco Santa Barbara
Viale Corrado IV for marathon events. Viale Corrado IV 
L'Aquila–Preturo Airport for road events.

Host country Italy topped the medal table with 50 medals including junior and yough events.

Participating nations
16 nations entered the competition.

Schedule

Times are Central European Summer Time (UTC+02:00)

Track

Road

Marathon

Medallists

Medal table

References

External links
Official website
Live streaming
Complete results on rollerenligne.com
Complete results on GliSport.info

Roller skating competitions
Inline Speed Skating European Championships
Inline Speed Skating European Championships
International sports competitions hosted by Italy
European Inline Speed Skating Championships